Eupoecilia inouei is a species of moth of the family Tortricidae. It is found in China (Guizhou, Hebei, Henan, Hunan, Jiangxi, Jilin, Ningxia, Shaanxi, Shanxi), Japan, Korea and Russia.

The wingspan is 13–16 mm.

References

Moths described in 1972
Eupoecilia